Fantastic is a genre of writing.

Fantastic or Fantastik may also refer to:

Music
Fantastic (Toy-Box album)
Fantastic (Wham! album)
Fan-Tas-Tic (Vol. 1), an album by Slum Village
Fantastic, Vol. 2, an album by Slum Village
Fantastic (EP), an EP by Henry Lau
"Fantastic" (song), a song by Ami Suzuki
"Fantastic!", a 1995 song by The Dismemberment Plan from !
"Fantastic", a 2017 song by Flume featuring Dave Bayley from Skin Companion EP 2

Publications
Fantastic (magazine), a fantasy-fiction magazine published from 1952 to 1980; title revived in the 1990s
Fantastic (comics), a weekly British comic published by Odhams Press under the Power Comics imprint

Other uses
Fantastic art, a non-realistic genre
Fantastic (TV channel), a defunct Polish television channel
Fantastic (TV series), a South Korean TV series

See also
Fantastik, a brand of cleaning products
Fantastique, a French genre associated with science fiction, horror and fantasy
Light Fantastic (disambiguation)
Mir Fantastiki, a Russian sci-fi and fantasy magazine
Mister Fantastic, a member of the Fantastic Four in Marvel Comics
The Fantasticks, an Off-Broadway musical play